Decca may refer to:

Music
 Decca Records or Decca Music Group, a record label
 Decca Gold, a classical music record label owned by Universal Music Group
 Decca Broadway, a musical theater record label
 Decca Studios, a recording facility in West Hampstead, England
 London Decca, a maker of turntable tonearms and cartridges
 Decca tree, a microphone recording system
 The Deccas, a guitar-based band from Medway, England
 Mpundi Decca, Congolese guitarist

Other
 Decca: The Letters of Jessica Mitford, a 2006 book by Jessica Mitford
 Decca Navigator System, a defunct marine and aeronautical navigation system
 Decca Radar, later Racal-Decca Marine, a defunct marine electronics manufacturer
 Decca Sports Ground, a cricket ground in London, England
 Decca, old spelling of Dhaka, capital of Bangladesh

See also
 Deca (disambiguation)
 Deccan (disambiguation), terms related to the Deccan Plateau in southern India